The women's 5000 metres at the 2014 European Athletics Championships took place at the Letzigrund on 16 August.

Medalists

Records

Schedule

Results

Final

References

Final Results

5000 W
5000 metres at the European Athletics Championships
2014 in women's athletics